The 1928 NYU Violets football team was an American football team that represented New York University as an independent during the 1928 college football season. In their fourth year under head coach Chick Meehan, the team compiled a 8–2 record. Ken Strong led the nation in scoring. The team was ranked No. 10 in the nation in the Dickinson System ratings released in December 1928.

Schedule

References

NYU
NYU Violets football seasons
NYU Violets football